Among the Irish Fisher Folk is a 1911 American silent documentary produced by Kalem Company. It was directed by Sidney Olcott

Production notes
The film was shot in Ireland, in Howth, co Dublin and on board a fishing boat, during summer of 1911.

References
 Michel Derrien, Aux origines du cinéma irlandais: Sidney Olcott, le premier oeil, TIR 2013.

External links

Among the Irish Fisher Folk at Irish Film & TV Research Online
 Among the Irish Fisher Folk website dedicated to Sidney Olcott

1911 films
American silent short films
American black-and-white films
Films set in Ireland
Films shot in Ireland
Films directed by Sidney Olcott
American short documentary films
1911 documentary films
1910s American films
1910s short documentary films
1910s English-language films